Park Chul-min (born January 18, 1967) is a South Korean actor.

Career
Park Chul-min began acting in his high school drama club at Chosun University High School, and though he majored in Business Administration at Chung-Ang University, he spent majority of his college years in theater circles. After graduating in 1988, Park joined the professional theater troupe Hyunjang (현장), and for 5 to 6 years he appeared in plays on Daehakro such as A Story of Old Thieves (늘근도둑 이야기) and Kim Cheol-sik of the Republic of Korea (대한민국 김철식).

After several years of doing bit parts onscreen, Park gained attention in 2004 for his roles in the film Mokpo, Gangster's Paradise and the period drama Immortal Admiral Yi Sun-sin. Since then, he has become one of the most prolific supporting actors in Korean cinema, most often cast in physical, comic performances in films such as Gwangju massacre drama May 18 (2007), romantic comedy Cyrano Agency (2010), monster movie Sector 7 (2011), and comedy satire Almost Che (2012). 
 
In 2014, Park starred in his first major leading role in Another Promise (formerly titled Another Family), the first 100%-crowdfunded Korean film based on the real-life story of Hwang Sang-ki, a Gangwon Province-based cab driver and his legal battle to win compensation for his daughter Yu-mi's death from leukemia in 2007 at age 23, which he believes was contracted when she worked for four years at a Samsung semiconductor factory. Despite little media attention on the case, the Seoul High Court ruled in Hwang's favor in 2011; the ruling was the first case in which an individual won a suit against a Korean conglomerate.

Filmography

Film

Television series

Variety show
Law of the Jungle in New Zealand (SBS, 2017)
Talk Club Actors (MBC, 2013) 
Film Culture Magazine VIP (MBN, 2010)

Theater
Thursday Romance  (2013-2014)
The Most Beautiful Goodbye in the World  (2010)
A Story of Old Thieves  (2008-2010, 2014-2015)
Kyung-sook, Kyung-sook's Father  (2007)
Stones in His Pockets (2005)
Kim Cheol-sik of the Republic of Korea

Awards
2010 6th University Film Festival of Korea: Best Supporting Actor (Cyrano Agency)
2009 5th Golden Ticket Awards: Best Actor in a Play (A Story of Old Thieves)
2008 MBC Drama Awards: Golden Acting Award, Supporting Actor (New Heart)
2008 5th Max Movie Awards: Best Supporting Actor (May 18) 
2005 KBS Drama Awards: Best Supporting Actor (Immortal Admiral Yi Sun-sin)

References

External links

1967 births
People from Gwangju
South Korean male film actors
South Korean male stage actors
South Korean male television actors
Living people
20th-century South Korean male actors
21st-century South Korean male actors
Chung-Ang University alumni
South Korean Buddhists